N. Yogish Bhat is a leader of Bharatiya Janata Party from Karnataka. He is a former member of the Karnataka Legislative Assembly elected from Mangalore City South(erstwhile Mangalore). Bhat has served as deputy speaker of the assembly .

Member of Legislative Assembly 
He was elected as Member of Legislative Assembly in the following years.
 2008
 2004
 1999
 1994

Positions held 
 Deputy speaker of the Legislative assembly

References

Politicians from Mangalore
Deputy Speakers of the Karnataka Legislative Assembly
Karnataka MLAs 2008–2013
Living people
Year of birth missing (living people)
Place of birth missing (living people)
Bharatiya Janata Party politicians from Karnataka